CAF Newport is a rolling stock factory located at Celtic Business Park, near Llanwern steelworks in Newport. The site was announced as a train-building factory in 2016 and was producing rolling stock by 2018. It was officially opened by HRH Prince Charles on 21 February 2020.

The factory is owned and operated by CAF Rolling Stock UK Ltd, a subsidiary of Construcciones y Auxiliar de Ferrocarriles. CAF have to date built both DMUs and EMUs at the site.

History
CAF have long supplied trains for the UK rail network from its factories in Spain. Products have included Class 3000 and Class 4000 DMU's for Northern Ireland Railways,  and  sets,  stock for the former Arriva Rail North franchise (now Northern Trains), Class 196 for West Midlands Trains, Class 197 for Transport for Wales and for TransPennine Express who ordered their Nova 2 and Nova 3 sets. CAF have also previously supplied their Urbos 3 trams for Edinburgh and the West Midlands Metro.

When searching for a possible site to construct trains in the UK, CAF looked at over 100 different locations before settling on one on a part of a defunct steelworks in Llanwern in South Wales. The west end of the site has a traverser, which enables easy access to lines without the need for excessive shunting, and a water test facility.

Expansion would have been be necessary to build the near  trains for HS2, if CAF had been successful in their bid. Initially, the site had just 12 employees, but that stood at 200 by the start of 2020. The company expects that the order book will necessitate expanding to 300 staff to fulfil those orders.

Construction of the factory started in 2016, with production of rolling stock starting in 2018. The site was officially opened by the Prince of Wales in February 2020.

CAF had stated that should they be awarded the contract to build trains for HS2, then they would be assembled in South Wales using their Oaris platform. However in December 2021, the contract was awarded to a competing manufacturer.

The bodyshells, bogies and engines are manufactured off site, and bodyshells specifically are produced at CAFs plants in Beasain, Zaragosa and Irun, but assembly and other manufacturing is undertaken at Newport.

Production at the site was ceased in March 2020 after the COVID-19 restrictions of social distancing came into effect in the United Kingdom. Bodyshell deliveries from Spain had ceased two weeks before the factory's closure, and although it was possible to continue building without the bodyshell deliveries, it was felt that it was unable to keep the workers at a safe distance from each other.

Classes built
For UK National Rail (the Civity platform):
Class 195
Class 196
Class 197
Class 331 (1 unit)

Other ventures
CAF also have other business strands operating out of the Newport site; all UK rolling stock works are concentrated on the site including design, system engineering and support to projects such as the passenger coaches for the Caledonian Sleeper and TransPennine Express which were built outside of the UK.

References

Sources

External links
 Official web page
  Recognising CAF’s Newport Plant #MadeInWales THE NEW WIPERS TIMES, 8 July 2020

Buildings and structures completed in 2018
Economy of Wales
Manufacturing plants in Wales
Rail transport in Wales
Railway workshops in Great Britain
2018 establishments in Wales
CAF rolling stock